Eleanor Elizabeth "Ellie" Chowns (born 7 March 1975) is a British Green Party politician, who served as a Member of the European Parliament (MEP) for the West Midlands from 2019 to 2020. She has been a councillor on Herefordshire Council since 2017, representing the Bishops Frome & Cradley ward, and is leader of the council's Green group.

Early life and education
Chowns studied geography, environmental studies, and development studies at the University of Sussex, graduating with a Bachelor of Arts (BA) degree in 1997. She then undertook a one-year Master of Professional Studies (MProf) degree in sustainable development at the University of Middlesex, graduating in 1998. She later undertook doctoral research in international development at the University of Birmingham. She completed her Doctor of Philosophy (PhD) degree in 2014, with a doctoral thesis titled "The political economy of community management: a study of factors influencing sustainability in Malawi's rural water supply sector".

Career
She is a specialist in international development, having worked for charities such as Voluntary Service Overseas and Christian Aid and as a lecturer at the University of Birmingham.

Political career
Chowns got involved in politics in 2015. In 2017 she was elected as a councillor on Herefordshire Council, and became the leader of the Green group. She also stood in the general election in North Herefordshire, securing 5.5% of the vote.

In May 2019, Chowns was re-elected onto the Herefordshire Council, with 78.6% of the vote. Later in the month, Chowns was subsequently elected as an MEP in the 2019 European elections, winning 10.66% of the vote share. In the same election, the Green Party won 7 MEPs, up from 3.

Chowns stood as the Green candidate for North Herefordshire, a safe Conservative seat, in the December 2019 parliamentary election. She won 9.3% of the vote share, the 6th highest Green vote share in the country and the highest of any seat where there was no Unite to Remain alliance.

Extinction Rebellion
Chowns was arrested on 14 October 2019 in Trafalgar Square defending the rights of Extinction Rebellion protesters to continue. She was released pending investigation, and later was one of the claimants to challenge the legality of the Section 14 order under which she was arrested. On 6 November 2019 the High Court ruled this blanket use of Section 14 by the Metropolitan Police was unlawful. Chowns declined to sue the Metropolitan Police for unlawful arrest, but declared the ruling to be a "victory for the right to peaceful assembly and protest, two cornerstones of our democracy".

Private life 
Chowns is a member of Giving What We Can, a community of people who have pledged to give at least 10% of their income to effective charities.

Selected works

References

1975 births
Living people
MEPs for England 2019–2020
21st-century women MEPs for England
Green Party of England and Wales MEPs
Green Party of England and Wales parliamentary candidates
People from Chertsey
21st-century British women politicians